The Kema is a river in Vytegorsky and Vashkinsky Districts of Vologda Oblast in Russia. It flows out of Lake Kemskoye and is a tributary of Lake Beloye. The main tributary is the Indomanka (left).

The source of the Kema is Lake Kemskoye in the north of Vytegorsky District. The river flows in the general direction south and enters Vashkinsky District. It accepts the Indomanka River from the left and turns southwest. The lower course of the river is a water reservoir.

The Kema belongs to the river basins of the Sheksna, the Volga, and the basin of the Caspian Sea. The river basin of the Kema comprises the eastern part of Vytegorsky District, the northern and the eastern parts of Vashkinsky District, and minor areas in Kargopolsky District of Arkhangelsk Oblast. The biggest river belonging to the basin of the Kema is the Soyda River, a tributary of Lake Kemskoye.

The Kema River freezes up in early November and stays icebound until late April.

Until the 1990s, the Kema was used for timber rafting.

References

External links

Rivers of Vologda Oblast